Rafit Eyad (born January 5, 1986, in Palestine) is a Palestinian professional football (soccer) player currently playing for Jerusalem side Jabal Al-Mukaber of the West Bank Premier League. He plays primarily as a centre back and is noted for his ability in the air and skill on the ball. Eyad received his first national team cap against Iran during the 2008 WAFF Championship.   He has since gone on to represent Palestine at the 2012 AFC Challenge Cup.

References

Living people
Palestinian footballers
Palestine international footballers
1986 births
Association football defenders
Footballers at the 2010 Asian Games
Asian Games competitors for Palestine